Tatyana Kapustina (born ) is a Kazakhstani weightlifter, who competed in the +63 kg category and represented Kazakhstan at international competitions. 

As a junior, she won the bronze medal at the 2014 Summer Youth Olympics.
She won a gold medal at the 2015 IWF Youth World Weightlifting Championships.

Major results

References

External links
 https://en.tengrinews.kz/sport/17-year-old-Kazakh-weightlifter-becomes-world-champion-259814/
 https://www.youtube.com/watch?v=uxFk7RRh_vY

1998 births
Living people
Kazakhstani female weightlifters
Place of birth missing (living people)
Weightlifters at the 2014 Summer Youth Olympics 
20th-century Kazakhstani women
21st-century Kazakhstani women